Joshua Quarshie (born 26 July 2004) is a German professional footballer who plays as a centre-back for Hoffenheim.

Professional career
Quarshie is a youth product of Schalke, Fortuna Düsseldorf and Rot-Weiss Essen. On 16 July 2022, he transferred to Hoffenheim, where he was originally assigned to their reserves. He made his senior and professional debut as a late substitute in a 2–1 Bundesliga loss to Wolfsburg on 9 November 2022.

International career
Born in Germany, Quarshie is of Ghanaian descent. He is a youth international for Germany, having played up to the Germany U19s.

References

External links
 
 DFB Profile

2004 births
Living people
Footballers from Duisburg
German footballers
Germany youth international footballers
German sportspeople of Ghanaian descent
Association football defenders
TSG 1899 Hoffenheim players
TSG 1899 Hoffenheim II players
Bundesliga players
Regionalliga players